The A342 is an A road in England that runs from Pewsham near Chippenham, Wiltshire to Andover, Hampshire.

Route
The road begins at the A4 junction just outside the small village of Pewsham, to the east of Chippenham. It heads south past the village of Derry Hill towards Devizes, briefly meeting the A3102 near Sandy Lane.  Just outside Devizes the road meets the A361, and once in the centre of town it meets the A360.  Continuing southeast in the Vale of Pewsey, under the northern slope of Salisbury Plain, the road reaches Upavon where it meets the A345 and turns east, over the Plain.  After passing through Everleigh the road meets the A338 before entering Ludgershall and meeting the A3026.  The final part of the route travels southeast where the road ends at a roundabout with the A343 and A303 just outside Andover.

Settlements on route
 Pewsham
 Derry Hill
 Devizes
 Sandy Lane
 Upavon
 Everleigh
 Ludgershall
 Andover

External links

SABRE page for the A342

Roads in England
Transport in Wiltshire
Transport in Hampshire